Keld Jul. Andersen (4 March 1946 – 6 November 2021) is a former Danish handball player who competed in the 1972 Summer Olympics.

He played his club handball with IF Stjernen, and was the top goalscorer of the club in the 1972/73 Danish Handball League season. In 1972 he was part of the Denmark men's national handball team which finished thirteenth in the Olympic tournament. He played all five matches and scored seven goals. He is the father of Anja Andersen, one of the most celebrated personalities in the history of Danish handball.

References

1946 births
2021 deaths
Danish male handball players
Olympic handball players of Denmark
Handball players at the 1972 Summer Olympics